Tmesisternus froggatti is a species of beetle in the family Cerambycidae. It was described by McLeay in 1868.

References

froggatti
Beetles described in 1868